Dada Masilo is a South African dancer and choreographer, known for her unique and innovative interpretations of classical ballets. Trained in classical ballet and contemporary dance, Masilo fuses these techniques with African dance steps to create her high-speed style. She was born and raised in the Johannesburg township of Soweto.  Although she is interested more in the personal challenge of choreography than political statements, her pieces often address taboos such as homosexuality and race relations.

Career

Education
Masilo studied at Braamfonteins National School for the Arts, 2002. Dada Masilo caught the eyes of Suzette Le Sueur, back then the Director of Dance factory school, and invited her to train professionally. Since then, Sueur became Masilo's mentor.

Performances
 Infecting the City 2012, Cape Town

 Dancing with Dada, in collaboration with William Kentridge
 Swasey Chapel at Denison University, 3 February 2012
 The Bitter End of Rosemary, Düsseldorf, Germany
 Jazzart Dance Theatre, Cape Town, 2003
 London School of Contemporary Dance, 2004
 One of Masilo's notable scene partners is South African contemporary dancer Kyle Heinz Rossouw

Notable works

Classical ballets
 Swan Lake
 Romeo and Juliet
 Carmen
 Death and the Maiden
 Giselle

Original works
 The Bitter End of Rosemary, based on Ophelia
 Dancing with Dada
 The Sacrifice based on Pina Bausch's Rite of Spring

References

External links
 Nedbank - Arts Life Project Details - Arts Affinities

Living people
South African choreographers
South African ballerinas
Contemporary dancers
Year of birth missing (living people)